The 2022 Illinois's 1st congressional district election was held on November 8, 2022, to elect the United States Representative for Illinois's 1st congressional district, concurrently with elections for the other U.S. House districts in Illinois and the rest of the country, as well as the 2022 U.S. Senate race in Illinois, other elections to the United States Senate, and various state and local elections. Primary elections were held on June 28. Before the 2020 redistricting cycle, the 1st district was primarily based in the South Side of Chicago. Under the new congressional map, although the 1st district is still based in Chicago, including portions of Bronzeville, Hyde Park, Grand Crossing, Morgan Park, and Roseland, it now reaches down to the southwest and takes in a collection of exurban and rural areas in Cook County and Will County, almost reaching Kankakee County. The former section is heavily black and the latter is heavily white; as a result, the district as a whole is slightly over 50% black.

Since 1993, the district had been represented by Democrat Bobby Rush. In his youth, Rush was a prominent civil rights activist and member of the Black Panther Party. He later served 10 years on the Chicago City Council before being elected to Congress. In 2000, he was challenged in the Democratic primary by then-state senator Barack Obama; Rush easily defeated Obama, who was elected president eight years later. After that election, Rush never faced another serious primary opponent and continued winning re-election easily due to the district's heavy Democratic lean; in 2020, he was re-elected with 73.8% of the vote. On January 3, 2022, Rush surprised many by announcing that he would retire rather than seek a sixteenth term in office, though he promised to remain active in public life.

Because Rush announced his retirement just six months before the primaries, the race to succeed him was brief. A wide field of candidates ran in the Democratic primary, including state senator Jacqueline Collins, Chicago alderwoman Pat Dowell, business professor Jonathan Jackson, and attorney Karin Norington-Reaves, whom Rush endorsed as his successor. Jackson won the primary with a low plurality and advanced to the general election, as did nonprofit founder Eric Carlson, who narrowly defeated gun dealer Jeff Regnier in the Republican primary. As expected in this solidly liberal district, Jackson easily dispatched Carlson. Jackson's election continued the 1st district's 93-year tradition of electing a black man as its representative, dating back to the election of Oscar De Priest in 1929. He took office in the 118th United States Congress in January 2023, joining the Congressional Progressive Caucus.

Democratic primary

Campaign
On January 5, Chicago City Council member Pat Dowell, who had previously been running a long-shot bid for Illinois Secretary of State, announced that she would drop out of that race and instead run to succeed Bobby Rush. Dowell was considered to have an advantage over other prospective candidates for the 1st district, as her Secretary of State campaign meant she had a ready-built campaign apparatus. On January 9, Karin Norington-Reaves, the CEO of a Chicago-based jobs agency, entered the race. Norington-Reaves had known Rush was retiring prior to his announcement, and Chicago Sun-Times journalist Lynn Sweet considered it likely that she would receive Rush's endorsement. Rush endorsed Norington-Reaves at a press conference on January 13. On January 28, Jonathan Jackson, a business professor, announced a bid for the seat. He is the son of reverend Jesse Jackson and the brother of former Illinois congressman Jesse Jackson Jr. Jackson was considered by Politico's Shia Kapos as having a strong base of support among labor unions, as his experience as owner of a construction company meant he had close contact with said unions. He also consolidated the support of progressives, receiving endorsements from U.S. Representative Chuy Garcia and Vermont Senator Bernie Sanders. State senator Jacqueline Collins entered the race in March and amassed more support from Chicago politicians than any other candidate.

In total, seventeen candidates made the primary ballot. Because there was such a wide array of candidates running, there was no clear frontrunner for much of the campaign, and  several prominent donors split their donations between three or more candidates. In the first quarter of 2022, fundraising was largely even among the leading candidates: Dowell raised about $380,000, as did businessman Jonathan Swain, while Norington-Reaves raised $291,000 and Jackson pulled in $140,000; due to state law, Collins was unable to fundraise because the legislature was still in session. In total, the candidates raised about $1.5 million. Former Illinois Criminal Justice Information Authority deputy director Charise Williams, My Block, My Hood, My City founder Jahmal Cole, and pastor Chris Butler also raised enough to run serious campaigns, and though she lagged in fundraising, anti-violence activist Ameena Matthews had name recognition from her 2020 campaign for this district. The 1st district primary saw significantly less outside spending than competitive Democratic primaries in the 3rd and 6th districts; this was attributed to the fact that the major candidates in the 1st district race had significantly less ideological differences than the major candidates in the other races, in part because several major candidates in this race had not previously held elected office and thus did not have a track record of votes to compare to the other candidates. However, Jackson and Collins were identified as the most progressive candidates in the race, with Dowell being the most moderate and Norington-Reaves in between. The candidates rarely criticized each other, primarily campaigning on their own experience and life story in an attempt to carve out a unique position in the crowded race. They prioritized door-to-door canvassing more than candidates in previous years, in part because the Illinois primary had been moved from March to June and the warmer weather made outdoor campaigning much easier.

On June 20, a week before the primary, Jackson attracted controversy after it was revealed that his campaign had received over $1 million from PACs associated with the cryptocurrency industry, most of which were owned by wealthy cryptocurrency executive Sam Bankman-Fried. One such PAC, Protect Our Future, spent over $500,000 on ads in support of Jackson's campaign, an amount nearly exceeding the contributions Jackson received from individuals. Jackson was a vocal supporter of cryptocurrency during his campaign and listed it as one of his key campaign issues. The race suddenly became more heated; Norington-Reaves criticized Jackson for presenting himself as a progressive despite taking large donations from super PACs, while Dowell accused him of putting a "for sale sign" on Rush's House seat. During a June 23 hearing of the House Agriculture Subcommittee on Commodity Exchanges, Energy, and Credit, Rush criticized cryptocurrency PACs for their outsized spending in the race to choose his successor, though he did not mention Jackson by name. Jackson also faced criticism for failing to file timely financial disclosures with the Federal Election Commission. Collins accused him of intentionally delaying his financial disclosures in order to hide who he was receiving money from. In response to the controversy, Jackson claimed that the donations were unsolicited and that his delay in filing disclosures was a mistake. PACs aligned with the cryptocurrency industry also spent on behalf of other Illinois House candidates in the 2022 cycle, including Chuy Garcia in the 4th district Democratic primary, Nikki Budzinski in the 13th district Democratic primary, and Rodney Davis in the 15th district Republican primary. In total, cryptocurrency PACs spent over $4 million in the 2022 Illinois primaries. The source of the funds is not entirely known, as many of the PACs' donors remain anonymous.

Candidates

Nominee 
 Jonathan Jackson, business professor, spokesperson for the Rainbow/PUSH coalition, son of reverend Jesse Jackson, and brother of former U.S. Representative Jesse Jackson Jr.

Eliminated in primary
Kirby Birgans, educator and advocate
Chris Butler, pastor
Jahmal Cole, founder of My Block, My Hood, My City
Jacqueline Collins, state senator
Steven DeJoie, consultant and restaurateur
Pat Dowell, Chicago City Council member
Cassandra Goodrum, professor of Criminal Justice at Chicago State University
Marcus Lewis, minister
Ameena Matthews, anti-violence activist, subject of The Interrupters, and candidate for this district in 2020
Karin Norington-Reaves, attorney and CEO of the Chicago Cook Workforce Partnership
Robert Palmer, educator
Terre Layng Rosner, Professor of Communication at the University of St. Francis
Jonathan Swain, businessman and former chair of the Chicago Zoning Board of Appeals
Michael Thompson, educator
Charise Williams, former deputy director of the Illinois Criminal Justice Information Authority

Removed from ballot
Darius Nix, educator

Declined
Marcus Evans, state representative (ran for re-election)
Nykea Pippion McGriff, realtor
Robert Peters, state senator (ran for re-election)
Bobby Rush, incumbent U.S. Representative
Elgie Sims, state senator (ran for re-election)

Polling

Endorsements

Results

Republican primary

Candidates

Nominee
Eric Carlson, nonprofit director and U.S. Army veteran

Eliminated in primary
Jeff Regnier, gun dealer
Philanise White, renal technician and nominee in 2020
Geno Young, musician

Results

General election

Predictions

Results

Notes

Partisan clients

References

External links
 Illinois State Board of Elections

2022 01
Illinois 01
United States House of Representatives 01